Russell Lake is a small shallow lake in Nova Scotia's Halifax Regional Municipality in the community of Dartmouth. The lake is bounded by the development of Russell Lake West to the west, Woodside to the south, Woodlawn to the north and Portland Estates to the east.

References
Russell Lake
Geographical Names Board of Canada
Explore HRM
Nova Scotia Placenames

Landforms of Halifax, Nova Scotia
Lakes of Nova Scotia
Landforms of Halifax County, Nova Scotia